Anton Julen (20 February 1898 – August 1982) was a cross country skier from Zermatt, Switzerland who competed in military patrol at the first winter Olympics in Chamonix in 1924. The Swiss team, which consisted of Alfred Aufdenblatten, Alfons Julen, Anton Julen and Denis Vaucher, finished first in the competition. He was brother of Alfons Julen, and cousin of the Olympians Oswald Julen (Nordic combined) and Simon Julen (cross country skiing).

References

External links

1898 births
1982 deaths
Swiss military patrol (sport) runners
Olympic biathletes of Switzerland
Military patrol competitors at the 1924 Winter Olympics
Olympic gold medalists for Switzerland
People from Zermatt
Medalists at the 1924 Winter Olympics
Sportspeople from Valais